Syedi Hasan Pir was a Taiyabi Ismaili saint of the 14th century in India. Hasan Pir was fifth Wali-ul-Hind on behalf of the Ismaili Taiyabi Da'i al-Mutlaq of Yemen. He was famous in the court of the Sultan of Patan, during the time of the Delhi Sultan Nasir ud din Muhammad Shah III and from lineage of Moulai Bharmal. He was martyred on 23rd Moharram 795 AH/ 1392 AD, and his mausoleum is located at Denmaal, Gujarat. Family tree showing relation with Moulai Bharmal and Dawoodi Bohra duat is as below. He was a descendant of Moulai Bharmal a minister of the King Jayasimha Siddharaja.

Photo gallery

References

Tayyibi Isma'ilism
Indian Muslims
1392 deaths